Claiborne Parish School Board is a school district headquartered in Homer, Louisiana, United States.

The district serves all of Claiborne Parish.

Former Claiborne Superintendent Gary Lee Jones became a Republican member of the Louisiana Board of Elementary and Secondary Education in January 2016.

History

In ???? the district had 2,019 students, a decrease by 102 from the previous year. In ???? the school district had a hiring freeze and planned to remove 60 job positions in order to reduce the district budget by $2.4 million.

Schools

PreK-12 schools
 Athens High School (Athens, formerly in the building housing the private Mt. Olive Christian School)
 Summerfield High School (Unincorporated area)

5-12 schools
 Haynesville Junior/Senior High School (Haynesville)

High schools
 Homer High School (Homer)

Junior high schools
 Homer Junior High School (Homer)

Elementary schools
 Homer Elementary School (Homer) - PK-5
 Haynesville Elementary School (Haynesville) - PreK-4

References

External links

Claiborne Parish School Board - Official site.

Education in Claiborne Parish, Louisiana
School districts in Louisiana